Universal Television is a Somali television channel. With its studio in London, it is the first and largest Somali TV satellite network of its type.

See also
Media of Somalia
Somali National Television
Shabelle Media Network
Somali Broadcasting Corporation
Somaliland National TV
Horn Cable Television

External links

References

Television channels in Somalia
Television channels and stations established in 1993